A list of alumni of Fitzwilliam College, Cambridge, one of the constituent colleges of the University of Cambridge in England. Its alumni include politicians, members of the judiciary, academics, industrialists, artists, athletes and journalists. This list also includes non-collegiate students affiliated to Cambridge University, known as students of Fitzwilliam House, prior to the granting of collegiate status in 1966.

The college has educated six winners of the Nobel Prize: Angus Deaton (2015, in Economics), Joseph Stiglitz (2001, in Economics), César Milstein (1981, in Medicine), Ernst Boris Chain (1945, in Medicine), Albert Szent-Györgyi (1937, in Medicine), Charles Sherrington (1932, in Medicine).

Heads of state or government, or royal consorts

Queen Sofía of Spain — Queen of Spain and wife of Juan Carlos I
Shankar Dayal Sharma — ninth President of India 
Lee Kuan Yew — first prime minister of Singapore
Subhas Chandra Bose — Indian nationalist and Head of the State and Prime Minister of the Provisional Government of Free India (1943-5)

Politicians and civil servants
Augustus Molade Akiwumi —  judge and the second Speaker of the Parliament of Ghana
Joseph Baptista — Indian politician and Mayor of Bombay 
Robert Battersby — Conservative MEP for Humberside (1979–89)
Denys Bullard — Conservative politician
Judith Bunting — Liberal Democrats MEP for South East England
Andy Burnham — Labour politician and Mayor of Greater Manchester (2017-)
Sir Dennis Byron —  former President of the Caribbean Court of Justice
Sir Vince Cable — Liberal Democrat MP and former Secretary of State for Business, Innovation and Skills (2010–15)
Sachindra Chaudhuri — Indian politician and Minister of Finance (1965-7)
Tanmanjeet Singh Dhesi — Labour MP
Dame Cressida Dick — police officer and Commissioner of the Met
Timothy Duke —  officer of arms at the College of Arms in London
Sir Kenneth Eaton —  Royal Navy officer who served as Controller of the Navy (1989–94)
Mike Gapes — former Labour MP
Bernard Georges — member of the National Assembly of the Seychelles
John Glen — Conservative MP, serving as Economic Secretary to the Treasury and City Minister
Tim Godwin — former Deputy Commissioner of London's Metropolitan Police Service
Julia Goldsworthy — former Liberal Democrats MP
Geoff Gollop — Conservative politician and former Lord Mayor of Bristol
J. E. Casely Hayford — Ghanaian politician
Heng Chee How — Singaporean politician 

Bernard Hogan-Howe — Commissioner of the Met (2011–17)
Sara Ibrahim — barrister and Labour activist
Dave Johnston — police officer
Alicia Kearns — Conservative MP for Rutland and Melton
Jim Knight — former Labour MP
Bashiru Kwaw-Swanzy — Attorney General of Ghana (1962–66)
Norman Lamont — Conservative politician and former MP
David Leakey — general and former Director of the European Union Military Staff 
Adrian Leppard — former Commissioner of City of London Police
Babar W. Malik — Pakistani Diplomat
Sir William Manning — colonial administrator
David Martin — Conservative MP for Portsmouth South (1987-1997)
Sir Jon Murphy — police officer 
Chris O'Connor — diplomat and former ambassador to Tunisia (2008–13)
Declan O'Loan — SDLP politician
Brian Paddick — Liberal Democrats politician and peer
G. G. Ponnambalam — Sri Lankan politician and founder of the All Ceylon Tamil Congress
Sir David Reddaway, British High Commissioner to Canada, British Ambassador to Ireland, British Ambassador to Turkey
Paikiasothy Saravanamuttu — Sri Lankan civil servant
Gilbert Granville Sharp — liberal politician and barrister
Samir Shihabi — President of the United Nations General Assembly (1991-2)
Mike Snelling — test pilot
Norman St John-Stevas — Conservative politician and Leader of the House of Commons (1979–81)
David Wilshire - Conservative Politician

Lawyers and judges

Nasir Aslam Zahid - Chief Justice of the Supreme Court of Pakistan
Dame Sarah Asplin — Court of Appeal Judge
Anthony Gates —  Chief Justice of Fiji
David Kitchin —  Justice of the Supreme Court of the United Kingdom
Andrew Li - Chief Justice of the Court of Final Appeal, Hong Kong
Sir Duncan Ouseley — High Court Judge
Dean Spielmann — President of the European Court of Human Rights (2013-5)
Marina Wheeler — barrister and former spouse of Boris Johnson

Academics

Science

Sir Shankar Balasubramanian — chemist and Herchel Smith Professor of Medicinal Chemistry
David Cardwell — engineer and head of the Department of Engineering, University of Cambridge
Min Chueh Chang — reproductive biologist, co-developer of the birth control pill
Sir Ernst Chain — biochemist and Nobel Prize winner
Henry Gee — palaeontologist and evolutionary biologist
David Lagourie Gosling — nuclear physicist
Vasant Gowarikar — physicist and scientific adviser to the Prime Minister of India (1991-3)
Albert Szent-Györgyi — biochemist and Nobel Prize winner
C. E. M. Hansel — psychologist 
Andy Harter — computer scientist
Christopher John Lamb — plant biologist
Harry Leitch — biologist
Anthony Michell — engineer
César Milstein — biochemist and Nobel Prize winner
 Jayant Narlikar - astrophysicist
Mark Pallen — microbiologist
Adam Scaife — physicist
Sir Charles Scott Sherrington — neurologist and Nobel Prize winner
 M. S. Swaminathan - geneticist, winner the first World Food Prize
 James Ward — Psychologist and philosopher, President of the Aristotelian Society (1919–20)

Mathematics
Richard Rado — mathematician
Arran Fernandez — mathematician and Senior Wrangler

Social Sciences
Nicholas Bloom — economist 
Sir Angus Deaton — economist and Nobel Prize winner (2015)
Geoff Dench — sociologist
Carlene Firmin — sociologist
Hal Lister — geographer
John Moore — economist
Norman Pounds — geographer and historian
Sigbert Prais — economist
Rogelio Ramírez de la O — econonomist
Gordon Redding — economist
T. Somasekaram — geographer
Joseph Stiglitz — economist and Nobel Prize winner

Humanities
Paul Mellars — archaeologist 
Bernard Orchard — biblical scholar
John Pickstone — historian of science
Derek Pringle — literary critic
M Harunur Rashid — literary critic and scholar of Sufism
Sir J. Eric S. Thompson  - translator of Mayan hieroglyphs
Charles Feinstein — historian 
John Hedley Brooke — historian of science
Catherine Barnard — legal scholar 
David W. Bebbington — historian 
Maurice Bloch — anthropologist

Louis Blom-Cooper lawyer and legal scholar
John Ingamells — art historian and former director of the Wallace Collection
Rhodri Jeffreys-Jones - historian
Sebastian Kim — theologian
Casimir Lewy — philosopher 
John M. Hull — theologist 
E. J. Lowe — philosopher
I. Howard Marshall — New Testament scholar
Moez Masoud — scholar of Islam

Clergy
John Alford — Archdeacon of Halifax (1972–84)
John Allen —  Provost of Wakefield (1982–97)
Mark Ashcroft — Bishop of Bolton (2016-)

Donald Baker — Bishop of Bendigo (1920–38)
John C. A. Barrett — Methodist minister 
James Harvey Bloom — clergyman and antiquarian
Frederick Bolton —  Dean of Leighlin (1963–83)
Leonard Cornwell — Archdeacon of Swindon (1947–63)
John Cox (priest) —  Archdeacon of Sudbury (1995-2006)
Richard Fenwick —  Bishop of St Helena (2011–18)
Robert Freeman — Bishop of Penrith
Richard Frith — Bishop of Hereford
David Garnett —  Archdeacon of Chesterfield (1996-2009)
John Gathercole — Archdeacon of Dudley (1987-2001)
David Goldie (priest) —  Archdeacon of Buckingham (1998-2002)
Leslie Griffiths — Methodist minister and life peer
Frederick Hazell —  Archdeacon of Croydon (1978–93)
Simon Heathfield — Archdeacon of Aston (2014-)
Vanessa Herrick — Archdeacon of Harlow 
Mike Hill —  Bishop of Bristol (2003–17)
Judy Hunt — Archdeacon of Suffolk (2009–12)
Clifford Jarvis — clergyman
Michael Langrish — Bishop of Exeter (2000–13)
John Lawton — Archdeacon of Warrington (1970–81)
Jane Leach — Methodist minister
David Lee (priest) — Archdeacon of Bradford (2004–15)
Norman Lesser — Archbishop of New Zealand (1961–71)
Richard Lewis — Dean of Wells (1990-2003)
Richard Llewellin — Anglican clergyman
Clifford Martin — Bishop of Liverpool (1944–65)
Gordon McPhate — former Dean of Chester 
Michael Middleton (priest) — Archdeacon of Swindon (1992-7)
Arthur Morris — Anglican bishop
Michael Nazir-Ali — Bishop of Rochester (1994-2009), Prelate of Honour of His Holiness
Peter Nott — Bishop of Norwich (1985–99)
Catherine Ogle — Dean of Winchester (2017-)
William Purcell — Archdeacon of Dorking (1968–82)
Alwyn Rice Jones — Archbishop of Wales (1991-9)
Harold Richards — priest
Peter Sertin — Anglican cleric
Brian Smith — Bishop of Edinburgh (2001–11)

Business

Sonita Alleyne — co-founder and former CEO of Somethin’ Else and Master of Jesus College, Cambridge
Simon Arora — CEO of the retail chain B%26M
Dinesh Dhamija — founder of Orbitz and Liberal Democrats MEP
Dermot Gleeson — executive chairman of M J Gleeson and former member of the Board of Governors of the BBC
Graham Love — businessman and CEO of Qinetiq
Helena Morrissey — financier 
Sir Ken Olisa — businessman and Lord-Lieutenant of Greater London
Christian Purslow — businessman and CEO of Aston Villa F.C.
Dame Sharon White — Chair of the John Lewis Partnership

Artists, writers and musicians
David Atherton — conductor
Catherine Banner — novelist
Pat Chapman — food writer
James Charlton — poet
Walford Davies — composer
Christopher de Bellaigue — journalist in the Middle East
Nick Drake — singer
Simon H. Fell — bassist and composer
Giles Foden — author of The Last King of Scotland
Maurizio Giuliano — traveller and author
Catherine Grosvenor — playwright
Lee Hall — playwright
Charlotte Hudson — actress 
Shiv K. Kumar — poet and novelist
Bem Le Hunte — novelist
Joseph McManners — singer
John Noble — baritone
James Norton — actor
Lawrence Osborne — novelist
Martin Outram — violist
Francis Scarfe — poet

Media

Sir Peter Bazalgette — television executive
Sir Humphrey Burton — music broadcaster
Nick Clarke — radio host
Tony Cornell — parapsychologist and TV personality
Trevor Dann — writer and broadcaster
Brian Dooley — TV writer 
Larry Elliott — journalist and economics editor at The Guardian
Robin Ellis — actor
Paul Henley — TV and radio journalist
Ciaran Jenkins — reporter with Channel 4
Ashley John-Baptiste — BBC broadcaster and presenter 
Nick Kochan — financial journalist
Christopher Martin-Jenkins — cricket journalist
Ahmed Rashid — journalist and author
Beth Rigby - current political editor of Sky News
Dan Roan — Sports Editor for BBC News
David Starkey - historian and TV presenter
 Tim Sullivan - Film and television director
 Ted Young - Editor of Metro

Sportspeople
Eddie Butler (rugby player) — former rugby player and sports commentator
Raymond Calverley — canoeist
Bernie Cotton — field hockey player 
Phil Edmonds — cricketer
Alastair Hignell — rugby player and cricketer
Michael Hutchinson — Northern Irish cyclist
Tony Jorden — rugby player and cricketer
Ed Kalman — rugby player
Peter Mather — fencer
Jamie McDowall — cricketer
Fiona McIntosh — fencer
Greg Nance — mountaineer and businessman
Sir Daniel Pettit — footballer and industrialist
Derek Pringle — cricketer
Martin Purdy — rugby player
Chris Saunders — cricketer and educator

References

Fitzwilliam College